Mauricio Fiol Villanueva (born March 26, 1994) is a Peruvian swimmer.  At the 2012 Summer Olympics, he competed in the Men's 200 metre butterfly, finishing in 25th place overall in the heats, failing to qualify for the semifinals. He has also won a bronze medal in 1500 metre free in the 2012 Swimming World Cup in Moscow, Russia.

Fiol won a silver medal at the 2015 Pan American Games in the 200 meter butterfly event, but was tested positive for stanozolol after the race. Fiol was stripped of his silver medal and disqualified from participating in the 2016 Olympics by the FINA and was banned for four years.

References

Peruvian male freestyle swimmers
1994 births
Living people
Olympic swimmers of Peru
Swimmers at the 2012 Summer Olympics
Peruvian male butterfly swimmers
Swimmers at the 2015 Pan American Games
Doping cases in swimming
Swimmers at the 2011 Pan American Games
South American Games silver medalists for Peru
South American Games bronze medalists for Peru
South American Games medalists in swimming
Competitors at the 2014 South American Games
Pan American Games competitors for Peru
21st-century Peruvian people